Sant Kabir Nagar Lok Sabha constituency is one of the 80 Lok Sabha (parliamentary) constituencies in Uttar Pradesh state in northern India. This Sant Kabir Nagar constituency came into existence in 2009 as a part of the implementation of delimitation of parliamentary constituencies based on the recommendations of the Delimitation Commission of India constituted in 2002.

Vidhan Sabha Segments
Presently, Sant Kabir Nagar Lok Sabha constituency comprises five Vidhan Sabha (legislative assembly) segments. These are:

Mehdawal and Khalilabad Vidhan Sabha segments were earlier part of the erstwhile Khalilabad Lok Sabha constituency.

Members of Lok Sabha

Election results

2019

2014

See also
 Khalilabad Lok Sabha constituency
 Sant Kabir Nagar district
 List of Constituencies of the Lok Sabha

Notes

External links
Sant Kabir Nagar lok sabha  constituency election 2019 result details

Lok Sabha constituencies in Uttar Pradesh
Sant Kabir Nagar district